Long View Farm Studios was a music recording studio located in North Brookfield, Massachusetts which was founded in 1974 by Gilbert Scott Markle, a professor at Clark University, on his farm property.

It was the location of recordings from many well-known musicians and bands, and it was used by the Rolling Stones as a rehearsal studio in 1981.

Markle died on March 20, 2015, aged 74.

Recordings

Songs
”Centerfold”
"Chip Away the Stone"
"I Will Follow You into the Dark"
"Working Too Hard"

Albums
American Garage
As Daylight Dies
Beggar's Oil
Break The Cycle
Children of Chaos
The Devil And God Are Raging Inside Me
Feed My Soul
Freeze Frame
Home
I Against I
It's Blitz!
LCD Soundsystem
Let's Be Nice
Love Stinks
Lunch for the Sky
Mind on the Moon
Misery is a Butterfly
Pandora's Box
Plans
Right Back
Sky Like a Broken Clock
Slip
Sound of Silver
Stain
Sunburn
Super Taranta!
Tale Of 2 Cities
Until The End
Visual Lies
Voices
 Autumn

Bands
Aerosmith
Arlo Guthrie
Alice In Chains
Automatic 7
Bad Brains
Birdbrain
The Boondock Saints
Blonde Redhead
Brand New
Bryan McFarland
Cat Stevens
Craving Lucy
Cyrus Erie
Dan Fogelberg
Dave Reid
DDT
Death Cab for Cutie
Devereaux
El Camino
Electrasy
Head East
The Holmes Brothers
The J. Geils Band
Jediah(Band)
John Belushi
The Kennedy Soundtrack
Kittie
LCD Soundsystem
Lifer
Living Colour
Lizzy Borden
Matchbook Romance
Mitch Winston and the band of Natural Selection
Pat Metheny Group
Pete Seeger
Quicksand
Relative Ash
Reveille
Rolling Stones
The Run
Rupert Holmes
Sevendust
Soulidium
Staind
State Radio
Stevie Wonder
Stuff
Three Days Grace
Tommy Tutone
Tim Curry
The Witness Protection Programme
Uncle Tupelo
Yeah Yeah Yeahs

References

Further reading 
 Williamson, Chet, "Gil Markle's Long View", Worcester Magazine, June 2003

External links
 "Diary of a Studio Owner: Gilbert Scott Markle"

Recording studios in the United States
Buildings and structures in Worcester County, Massachusetts
Companies based in Worcester County, Massachusetts